BelOMO or Belorusskoe Optiko-Mechanichesckoye Obyedinenie (Беломо or Белорусское оптико-механическое объединение, Belarus Optical & Mechanical Association) was founded in Minsk in 1971 in Byelorussian SSR, Soviet Union, now Belarus. The main factory is the Minskiy Mechanichesckiy Zavod imeni S.I. Vavilova, opened in Minsk 1957 and named after the Soviet physicist Sergey Ivanovich Vavilov (1891–1951).

At first, BelOMO made photographic equipment and lens-making machinery for state use. It now manufactures a wide range of products, including military and consumer optical products. During the 1980s it produced the Agat-18 and Agat-18K half-frame 35mm cameras, still popular among Lomographic photographers.

A joint venture with German optics maker Zeiss was begun in 1995. The firm produces lenses and optical elements for microscopes and other optical equipment with ISO 9001 certification.

MMZ—BelOMO factory estimates its global market share in optical sights, rangefinders and NVDs at 2-3%, with 10% of Russian market and 80% of local market. The factory also produces gas meters, car units, infra-red emitters, juicers and other civil products.

Camera models
 Agat-18
 Agat-18K
 Chaika
 Elikon-35CM
 Vilia

References

External links
 BelOMO website
 Website of Zeiss BelOMO joint venture

Manufacturing companies of the Soviet Union
Optics manufacturing companies
Photography in the Soviet Union
Companies of Belarus
Organizations based in Minsk
Economy of Minsk
Manufacturing companies established in 1971